Ingun Bjørnsgaard is a Norwegian choreographer.

Career 
In 1992, Ingun Bjørnsgaard established her own dance company, Ingun Bjørnsgaard Prosjekt (IBP). With this company she has created more than 10 ballets, touring throughout Norway and a variety of European venues and cities. While developing her art as a choreographer with IBP, Bjørnsgaard has also worked on a regular basis as a visiting choreographer with companies such as the Royal Ballet (Kungliga National Baletten) in Stockholm, Sweden; Skånes Dance Theatre (Skånes Dansteater) in Malmö, Sweden; Carte Blanche in Bergen, Norway; the Norwegian National Theatre (Nationaltheatret) in Oslo; Komische Oper in Berlin; the Norwegian National Ballet (Nasjonalballetten) – among other projects, she created a full-length commissioned ballet for the inauguration of Oslo's new opera house in 2008 − and recently with Nordwest Tanzcompagnie in Bremen and Oldenburg. IBP's characteristic style has evolved gradually over the years in close collaboration with the different dancers that make up the company.

References

External links 
Ingun Bjørnsgaard Prosjekt

Norwegian choreographers
Living people
Year of birth missing (living people)